Färila IF is a Swedish football club located in Färila.

Background
Färila IF currently plays in Division 4 Hälsingland which is the sixth tier of Swedish football. They play their home matches at the Färila IP in Färila.

The club is affiliated to Hälsinglands Fotbollförbund.

Season to season

In their most successful period Färila IF competed in the following divisions:

In recent seasons Färila IF have competed in the following divisions:

Footnotes

External links
 Färila IF – Official website
 Färila IF official fan club on Facebook

Football clubs in Gävleborg County